Bohm is a surname. Notable people with the surname include:

Alec Bohm (born 1996), baseball player
Carl Bohm (1844–1920), German songwriter and composer
David Bohm (1917–1992), American theoretical physicist
Dorothy Bohm (born 1924), Königsberg-born British photographer
Elisabeth Bohm (1843–1914), Russian artist
Hark Bohm (born 1939), German actor
Marquard Bohm (1941–2006), German actor
Michael Bohm (born 1965), American-born journalist of Russia
Uwe Bohm (1962-2022), German actor

See also
 Böhm (disambiguation)

German-language surnames
Jewish surnames